The 1990 Michigan State Spartans football team represented Michigan State University as a member of the Big Ten Conference during the 1990 NCAA Division I-A football season. Led by eighth-year head coach George Perles, the Spartans compiled an overall record of 8–3–1 with a mark of 6–2 in conference play, placing in four-way tie for the Big Ten title with Illinois, Iowa, and Michigan.

Schedule

Personnel
 OT No. 77 Eric Moten, Sr.

Game summaries

Michigan

Team members in the NFL

References

Michigan State
Michigan State Spartans football seasons
Big Ten Conference football champion seasons
Sun Bowl champion seasons
Michigan State Spartans football